James Aloysius Gallagher (June 8, 1909 in East Newark, New Jersey – April 16, 1992 in Belmar, New Jersey) was an American soccer player who earned two caps with the United States national soccer team. One cap came at the 1928 Summer Olympics where the U.S. lost to Argentina in the first round.  He earned his second cap in a 3–2 away win with Poland on June 10, 1924.  At the time, he played for Ryerson Juniors.

References

External links
 

1909 births
1992 deaths
American soccer players
Olympic soccer players of the United States
Footballers at the 1928 Summer Olympics
United States men's international soccer players
Association football midfielders